Darreh-ye Rizi (also Romanized as Darreh-ye Rīzī) is a village in Seydun-e Shomali Rural District, Seydun District, Bagh-e Malek County, Khuzestan Province, Iran. At the 2006 census, its population was 160, in 32 families.

References 

Populated places in Bagh-e Malek County